The Wine Museum and Enoteca (in Portuguese, Museu do Vinho e Enoteca) is a Brazilian museum and enoteca, located in Porto Alegre in the old building of the plant's gas tank. The museum carries approximately 250 varieties of wines produced by 32 wineries in Rio Grande do Sul, with descriptive guidance products. The Enoteca is the only wine museum in Brazil, with international standards comparable to the French, and the second in Latin America in the public domain. The collection of the museum also keeps parts and equipment used in the initial period of industrialization of wine.

References

External links
Adega24.com — Tudo sobre vinho 
Usina do Gasômetro, sede do Museu do Vinho e Enoteca  

Museums in Porto Alegre
Wine museums